As Serious as Your Life is a solo album by the multi-instrumentalist and composer Joe McPhee, recorded in 1996 and released on the Swiss HatHut label in 1998. The title track is named for the book by Val Wilmer.

Reception

AllMusic reviewer Brian Olewnick stated: "As Serious as Your Life offers a fairly wide picture of the range of his talents and creative genius, and is arguably the finest of his solo recordings. Highly recommended".

Track listing 
All compositions by Joe McPhee except as indicated
 "The Death of Miles Davis" - 6:28
 "A Wish in One Hand" - 6:42
 "Ain't Nothin' But the Blues" - 5:30
 "As Serious as Your Life 1" - 9:11
 "Haiku Study 1" - 4:43
 "Conlon in the Land of Ra" - 5:10
 "The Man I Love" (George Gershwin, Ira Gershwin) - 6:47
 "Tok" - 2:27
 "As Serious as Your Life 2" - 3:21
 "After the Rain" (John Coltrane) - 5:26
 "Party Lights" - 1:03

Personnel 
Joe McPhee - reeds, pocket cornet, piano, electronics

References 

Joe McPhee albums
1998 albums
Hathut Records albums